"Middle of Nowhere" is a song by Canadian indie rock band Hot Hot Heat and is taken from their second album, Elevator. The song was released in the UK and US as the second single from Elevator on July 18, 2005.

The song reached No. 23 on the U.S. Modern Rock Tracks chart, as well as reaching a peak of No. 47 in the UK Singles Chart. The music video was directed by Marc Webb.

This song was featured in USA's show, Psych, in the tenth episode of season 1, entitled "From Earth to Starbucks". This song was also featured in The CW show, One Tree Hill, in episode 21 of season 3, entitled "Over the Hills and Far Away".

References

2005 songs
2005 singles
Hot Hot Heat songs
Sire Records singles
Music videos directed by Marc Webb
Songs written by Dante DeCaro
Song recordings produced by Dave Sardy
Songs written by Steve Bays